Leslie Faber may refer to:

Leslie Faber (actor), English actor (1879–1929)
A character in a dramatisation of the Glen Ridge rape case